Harald Hauptmann (19 April 1936 – 2 August 2018) was a German archaeologist known for his excavation work in east and southeast Turkey at sites such as Norşuntepe. He also studied of pre-Islamic Pakistan. He was a professor at the University of Heidelberg and a foreign-member of the Serbian Academy of Sciences and Arts.

Hauptmann was born in Ratkau, Kreis Troppau, in the former Czechoslovakia.

References 

German archaeologists
Prehistorians
Academic staff of Heidelberg University
Members of the Serbian Academy of Sciences and Arts
1936 births
2018 deaths
Sudeten German people
People from Opava District